Vincenzo "Enzo" Liberti (20 April 1926 – 4 May 1986) was an Italian actor, voice actor, director and television personality.

Biography
Born in Rome, after having been a diplomatic courier for the Foreign Ministry, he began his artistic career immediately after the Second World War as a stage actor, especially in comedy plays in Romanesco dialect; he mostly acted along with his wife Leila Durante and her parents Checco and Anita at the Teatro Rossini in Rome. A character actor in many films, he played the lead roles in his two films as a director, in 1954 and in 1955. Liberti was also very active on television, as a sidekick of Raimondo Vianello in several variety shows and as an actor in television films and series.

Death
Liberti died at age 60 in a clinic in Saint-Laurent-du-Var, near Nice, where he underwent surgery on his heart.

Filmography

Films

 Se vincessi cento milioni, directed by Carlo Campogalliani and Carlo Moscovini (1953)
 Carmen di Trastevere, directed by Carmine Gallone (1962)
 Made in Italy, directed by Nanni Loy (1965)
 Soldati e capelloni, directed by Ettore Maria Fizzarotti (1967)
 Non cantare, spara, directed by Daniele D'Anza (1968)
 I ragazzi del massacro, directed by Fernando Di Leo (1969)
 Oh dolci baci e languide carezze, directed by Mino Guerrini (1969)
 Bella di giorno, moglie di notte, directed by Nello Rossati (1971)
 Buona parte di Paolina, directed by Nello Rossati (1973)
 La polizia è al servizio del cittadino?, directed by Enzo G. Castellari (1973)
 Mordi e fuggi, directed by Dino Risi (1973)
 I sette magnifici cornuti, directed by Luigi Russo (1974)
 Due sul pianerottolo, directed by Mario Amendola (1975)
 Donna… cosa si fa per te, directed by Giuliano Biagetti (1976)
 Colpita da improvviso benessere, directed by Franco Giraldi (1976)
 Taxi Girl, directed by Michele Massimo Tarantini (1977)
 L'appuntamento, directed by Giuliano Biagetti (1977)
 Assassinio sul Tevere, directed by Bruno Corbucci (1979)
 Liquirizia, directed by Salvatore Samperi (1979)
 Ciao marziano, directed by Pier Francesco Pingitore (1980)
 Pierino contro tutti, directed by Marino Girolami (1981)
 I carabbimatti, directed by Giuliano Carnimeo (1981)
 Il paramedico, directed by Sergio Nasca (1982)
 Bello mio, bellezza mia, directed by Sergio Corbucci (1982)
 Pierino colpisce ancora, directed by Marino Girolami (1982)
 Vacanze in America, directed by Carlo Vanzina (1984)

Television

 Le inchieste del commissario Maigret, directed by Mario Landi – 1 episodio (1968)
 Astronave Terra, directed by Alberto Negrin (1971)
 Prima, durante e dopo la partita, directed by Gian Domenico Giagni (1972)
 Qui squadra mobile, directed by Anton Giulio Majano – 1 episodio (1973)
 Tante scuse, directed by Romolo Siena (1974)
 Diagnosi, directed by Mario Caiano (1975)
 Di nuovo tante scuse, directed by Romolo Siena (1975/1976)
 Due ragazzi incorreggibili, directed by Romolo Siena (1976)
 Il commissario De Vincenzi 2, directed by Mario Ferrero – 1 episodio (1977)
 Noi... no!, directed by Romolo Siena (1977–1978)
 Attenti a noi due (1983)
 Zig zag (1983–1986)

As director
 Il porto della speranza (anche fotografia e sceneggiatura) (1954)
 Processo all'amore (anche soggetto sceneggiatura) (1955)

References

External links

1926 births
1986 deaths
Male actors from Rome
Italian male film actors
Italian male voice actors
Italian male television actors
Italian male stage actors
20th-century Italian male actors